Percy Howard (13 February 1871 – 21 August 1955) was an Australian rules footballer who played with Melbourne in the Victorian Football League (VFL).

Notes

External links 		

Percy Howard at Demonwiki

1871 births
Australian rules footballers from Victoria (Australia)
Melbourne Football Club players
1955 deaths